We Want a Child! is a 1949 Danish drama film directed by Lau Lauritzen Jr. and Alice O'Fredericks.

Cast
 Ruth Brejnholm - Else, the bride
 Jørgen Reenberg - The bridegroom
 Maria Garland - The bride's mother
 Grethe Thordahl - Jytte, the bride's friend
 Preben Lerdorff Rye - Her friend
 Jeanne Darville - The bride's cousin
 Betty Helsengreen - A proprietress
 Else Jarlbak - A businesswoman
 Karen Berg - A consultant
 Alma Olander Dam Willumsen - A midwife
 Berit Erbe - A health visitor
 Ib Schønberg - Uncle Hans
 Ib Freuchen - Doctor

External links

1949 films
1940s Danish-language films
1949 drama films
Danish black-and-white films
Films directed by Lau Lauritzen Jr.
Films directed by Alice O'Fredericks
Films scored by Sven Gyldmark
Lippert Pictures films
Danish drama films